Raymond Devey (19 December 1917 – 26 June 2001) was an English professional footballer who played in the Football League for Birmingham City and Mansfield Town. He played as a centre half.

Devey was born in the Tyseley district of Birmingham. He joined Birmingham as a junior, and turned professional in 1937. The Second World War put a stop to his career development, and he finally made his Football League debut on 21 September 1946, at the age of 28, deputising for Arthur Turner in a Second Division game at home to Newport County which finished as a 1–1 draw. Devey joined Mansfield Town at the start of the 1947–48 season, and he played 76 games in the Third Division North before finishing off his playing career with a brief spell at non-league Hereford United.

Devey returned to Birmingham City, where he spent the remainder of his working life, performing a variety of backroom roles including reserve team trainer and coach, first-team trainer, physiotherapist and kit-man. He retired in 1983. He died in 2001 at the age of 83.

References

1917 births
2001 deaths
Footballers from Birmingham, West Midlands
English footballers
Association football defenders
Birmingham City F.C. players
Mansfield Town F.C. players
Hereford United F.C. players
English Football League players
Place of death missing